Froly is a rural locality (a selo) and the administrative center of Frolovskoye Rural Settlement, Permsky District, Perm Krai, Russia. The population was 1,973 as of 2010. There are 33 streets.

Geography 
Froly is located 11 km south of Perm (the district's administrative centre) by road. Nestyukovo is the nearest rural locality.

References 

Rural localities in Permsky District